Warren Carlos Sapp  (born December 19, 1972) is an American former professional football player who was a defensive tackle in the National Football League (NFL) for 13 seasons, primarily with the Tampa Bay Buccaneers. Sapp played college football at Miami, where he won the Lombardi Award, Bronko Nagurski Trophy, and Bill Willis Trophy as a junior, and was selected by the Buccaneers in the first round of 1995 NFL Draft. He spent nine seasons with the Buccaneers and was a member of the Oakland Raiders in his last four seasons. Following Sapp's NFL career, he was an analyst on NFL Network until 2015.

With Tampa Bay, Sapp made seven Pro Bowl appearances, earned first-team All-Pro honors four times, and was part of the team that won the franchise's first Super Bowl title in Super Bowl XXXVII. He compiled 96.5 career sacks by the time of his retirement, which are the third-highest career sacks for a defensive tackle and the 28th-highest overall for a defensive lineman. His career, however, was also checkered by controversy from his hard-hitting style of play and occasional verbal outbursts. Along with Lee Roy Selmon and teammate Derrick Brooks, Sapp is one of three players to have his number retired by the Buccaneers. He was inducted to the Pro Football Hall of Fame in 2013.

Early years
Sapp was born in Orlando, Florida, and raised in Plymouth, Florida, by a single mother.  During the late 1980s, he was honored for outstanding football play at Apopka High School in Apopka, Florida at linebacker, tight end, place-kicker and punter.  He holds school records for sacks, tackles for a loss, and longest field goal.  A two-sport athlete in high school, he also played on the basketball team as a power forward.  In high school football, his hard tackle of Johnny Damon in a game against Dr. Phillips High School team gave the future major league baseball star a concussion.

In 2007, Sapp was named to the Florida High School Association All-Century Team comprising the top 33 players in a hundred years of high school football in his home state.

College career
Many top nationally ranked college football programs recruited Sapp and he played at the University of Miami for the Hurricanes, where he was a defensive standout. He converted to defensive lineman and in 1994 won the Bronko Nagurski Trophy (for best defensive player), the Lombardi Award (for best lineman or linebacker), and the Bill Willis Award (for best defensive lineman).  As a junior at Miami in 1994, he had 84 tackles and led the Hurricanes in sacks with 10.5 sacks.  He also finished sixth in Heisman Trophy voting that year.

Professional career

Tampa Bay Buccaneers

1995 NFL Draft 
Ahead of the 1995 NFL Draft, Sapp ran the fastest time in the 40-yard dash for a defensive tackle (4.69 sec). Sapp was considered a potential top five or 10 pick, but due to reports of multiple failed cocaine and marijuana tests released the night before the draft, many teams passed on him. He was ultimately selected 12th overall by the Tampa Bay Buccaneers in the first round. The NFL released a statement strongly denying the rumors and Sapp believed an anonymous individual attempted to intentionally sabotage his draft chances.

1996-1999
Sapp was almost immediately given the starting job as the right defensive tackle, which he held for his entire nine-year stay in Tampa.  He flourished in the Tampa 2 defense, which included teammates Derrick Brooks and John Lynch. With his devastating combination of size and speed, he was able to disrupt opposing offenses even when double- or even triple-teamed on the line.

He finished his rookie season with 27 tackles and one interception and continued to be a prolific tackler for the Buccaneers. He registered 51 tackles and nine sacks in 1996, and 58 tackles and 10.5 sacks in 1997. His Pro Bowl selection in 1997 was the first of seven straight. In 1998, he signed a contract extension paying $36 million over six years.  He was honored as NFL Defensive Player of the Year in 1999.

2002 
In 2002, the Bucs led the league in defense and won Super Bowl XXXVII over the Oakland Raiders. Sapp made five tackles and two sacks during that postseason.

Week 12: Mike Sherman Confrontation 
On November 24, 2002, at Raymond James Stadium, Sapp was strongly criticized for a blindside hit on the Green Bay Packers' Chad Clifton. The hit occurred during a Buccaneers interception return, when Sapp hit Clifton as the latter was jogging downfield, away from the main action. The hit inflicted a severe pelvic injury and hospitalized Clifton for almost a week, after which he could not walk unaided for the next five weeks. In 2005, the NFL Competition Committee agreed on new guidelines for "unnecessary roughness", making hits such as Sapp's on Clifton illegal.

In an exchange caught by television cameras following the game, Packers coach Mike Sherman approached Sapp and said to him, "That was a chickenshit play." In response, Sapp screamed at Sherman: "You talk tough? Put a jersey on!" Sapp later called Sherman "a lying, shit-eating hound. ... If I was 25 years old and didn't have a kid and a conscience, I would have given him an ass-kicking right there at the 30-yard line." Sherman later added, "The joviality that existed after [the hit] when a guy's lying on the ground, with numbness in his legs and fingers, I just thought that wasn't appropriate for any NFL player."

Week 16: First skipping incident 
During pregame warmups for the December 23, 2002 Monday Night Football game at Raymond James Stadium, Sapp skipped among the Pittsburgh Steelers as they warmed up. Steelers running back Jerome Bettis shoved him, touching off a heated argument between the two teams. Sapp was not fined for the incident, but it added to his controversial image and he felt he had been made an example by the NFL by being fined for a second Monday night skipping incident (described below). "That's all this is about," said Sapp. "In my nine years in this league, no one's been fined for verbally abusing officials. It's unprecedented." The Buccaneers had been earlier ridiculed by Steelers' Lee Flowers as being "paper champions."

2003 
In 2003, during a Monday Night Football game against the Indianapolis Colts on October 6, Sapp was scolded for skipping through and disrupting the Colts, who were spread out on the field stretching during warmups. Much anticipation and national interest going into the game had been generated by the return of former head coach Tony Dungy to Tampa. The Colts wound up erasing a 21-point deficit in the final four minutes and defeating the Buccaneers 38–35 in overtime, sending the defending champions into a downslide.

The next Sunday, October 12, 2003, before the Buccaneers took on the Washington Redskins, Sapp, while running onto the field, bumped into an NFL referee and drew a $50,000 fine. His response: "It's a slave system. Make no mistake about it. Slavemaster say you can't do it, don't do it. They'll make an example out of you."

Oakland Raiders

In 2004, Sapp was reportedly interested in accepting a contract offer from the Cincinnati Bengals for four years worth US $16 million, but on March 20 he announced he had agreed to terms on a seven-year, $36.6 million contract with the Oakland Raiders, the same team he had helped rout in the Super Bowl in early 2003.

He started all 16 games in his first season in Oakland, splitting time at defensive end and defensive tackle, recording 30 tackles (18 solo) and 2.5 sacks and recovering two fumbles after having lost an estimated 20 pounds before joining the Raiders for the 2004 season.

His 2005 season got off to a great beginning back in his familiar defensive tackle position. He started the first ten games of the season with 29 tackles (26 of them solo), and finished second on the team to Derrick Burgess with five sacks before being sidelined for the last six games of 2005 with a shoulder injury.

He returned to his All-Pro form in 2006. He had 10 sacks to go along with 32 tackles (16 solo) and one forced fumble.

2007 
He lost 49 lb before the 2007 season, and recorded 37 tackles (24 solo), 2 sacks and 2 forced fumbles.

On December 23, 2007, Sapp got ejected after an altercation with the officials near the end of the second quarter of the Raiders' game at Jacksonville. The incident began when linesman Jerry Bergman mistakenly assumed that the Raiders would decline a ten-yard Jaguar penalty. Sapp, the defensive captain, shot back at referee Jerome Boger, that the Raiders wanted to accept the penalty. The conversation became heated, with Sapp gesturing and swearing, provoking Boger to flag him for unsportsmanlike conduct. But Sapp and the rest of the Raider defense continued to mouth off at the officials, resulting in a second unsportsmanlike against Sapp and a third unsportsmanlike against teammate Derrick Burgess. Finally, the coaches ran onto the field and, along with the officials, began physically separating the disgruntled players. Boger claimed that Sapp had "bumped" him in the process, while Sapp denied any physical contact. In any event, Boger then levied a third unsportsmanlike conduct penalty against Sapp (fourth against the team) and ejected him. The league eventually fined him $75,000, and Burgess $25,000 (i.e., $25,000 for each unsportsmanlike penalty).

On January 3, 2008, Sapp told Raider owner Al Davis over the phone that he would retire and confirmed this on his website qbkilla.com in just two words: "I'M DONE!" The retirement became official on March 4, 2008.

Legacy

At the time of his retirement, Sapp was one of only twelve defensive players in NFL history to make the Pro Bowl, be named Defensive Player of the Year and win a Super Bowl or pre-Super Bowl NFL title. The others are Mean Joe Greene, Jack Lambert, Mel Blount, Lester Hayes, Mike Singletary, Lawrence Taylor, Bob Sanders, Deion Sanders, Reggie White, Ray Lewis, Rod Woodson, and Sapp's former teammate, Derrick Brooks. Michael Strahan, James Harrison, Ed Reed, Troy Polamalu, Charles Woodson, Terrell Suggs, Stephon Gilmore, and Aaron Donald have since joined the list.  He is now considered to be the prototype three-technique defensive tackle, and ever since his retirement NFL teams scouting defensive tackles have reportedly been looking for a "Baby Sapp". He was selected to seven Pro Bowls, was named a first-team All-Pro four times and a second-team All-Pro twice, voted to the 1990s and 2000s All-Decade Teams, and earned Defensive Player of the Year honors after a 12.5-sack season in 1999.

NFL career statistics

Personal life
In January 1998, Sapp married Jamiko Vaughn.  The couple had two children, daughter Mercedes in 1998 and Warren Carr II in 2000.

Activities
Sapp, Devin Bush and a developer created an Urban Solutions Group in 2006 to construct low-income housing in Fort Pierce, Florida. The PNC Bank loaned the group money, but by 2008 the real estate market tanked and the project ended in failure.

On August 19, 2008, Sapp was hired as a studio analyst for Inside the NFL on Showtime, a position he held until 2011.

In the fall of 2008, Sapp appeared as a contestant on the seventh season of Dancing With The Stars. Sapp's partner for the competition was professional dancer Kym Johnson; the pair made it to the finals where they were eventually named runner-up of season 7.

He made his stand-up comedy debut at the Comedy Central Roast of Larry the Cable Guy on March 16, 2009.

He worked for NFL Network as an analyst featured on NFL Total Access and NFL GameDay Morning until he was fired in 2015 following his arrest for solicitation. In the summer of 2012 he released a book titled Sapp Attack through St. Martins Publishing.

In June 2012, Sapp teamed up with the NOC (Network Of Champions), a YouTube premium content channel, to produce a TV show series called "Judge Sapp". He also participated in Fox's dating game show The Choice.

In January 2013, Sapp worked with Dr. Jonathan Greenburg to raise awareness about the importance of getting tested and treated for snoring and obstructive sleep apnea.

He was also a celebrity judge on the second season of the reality show BBQ Pitmasters.

On July 27, 2016, Sapp was bitten by a shark while lobstering off the coast of Florida.

In October, 2020 the internet sportsbook BetUS announced Warren Sapp and Brian Jones as the hosts of the weekly podcast "BetUS Unfiltered". Sapp and Jones have interviewed celebrities such as Derrick Johnson, Adam Schefter, Ray Lewis, Kevin Carter, Rick Neuheisel, and Jen Welter on the podcast.

Legal troubles
On February 7, 2010, Sapp was arrested in South Florida and charged with domestic battery while in Florida as an analyst for the NFL Network's coverage of Super Bowl XLIV, but following the arrest the NFL Network cancelled his appearance. On March 24, however, the charges against Sapp were dropped.

On February 2, 2015, the day after Super Bowl XLIX, Sapp was arrested on suspicion of soliciting a prostitute and assault. Later that day it was revealed Sapp's contract had been terminated by the NFL Network. In May 2015 the charges were dismissed.

Bankruptcy
In 2010, PNC Bank was awarded a judgment of $988,691.99, and in December 2011 filed a monthly lien of $33,333 against Sapp's $45,000 NFL Network paycheck. He also owed the Internal Revenue Service $853,003 from income in 2006 and $89,775 for 2010. He was $876,000 behind on alimony and child support for his former spouse, owed $68,738 for unpaid property taxes in Windermere and owed money to attorneys, friends and a speech therapist as well.

On April 7, 2012, the Associated Press reported that Sapp had filed for bankruptcy in an effort to discharge debt from failed businesses. In these Chapter 7 filings, he claimed to have lost his University of Miami championship rings and his Buccaneer Super Bowl ring. The balance in his checking and savings accounts was said to be less than $1,000. He claimed no credit card debt and owns no automobiles, but owes National Car Rental $90,685 through his business, Nine-Nine LLC. Court filings indicated Sapp's assets totaled $6.45 million against a debt of $6.7 million. His monthly income was reported as $115,861. On November 1, 2012, Sapp's  house in Windermere was auctioned off and sold for $2.9 million.

Explanatory notes

References

External links

 
 
 

1972 births
Living people
African-American players of American football
All-American college football players
American football defensive ends
American football defensive tackles
Dr. Phillips High School alumni
Miami Hurricanes football players
National Conference Pro Bowl players
National Football League announcers
National Football League Defensive Player of the Year Award winners
National Football League players with retired numbers
Oakland Raiders players
Participants in American reality television series
Players of American football from Orlando, Florida
Pro Football Hall of Fame inductees
Sportspeople from Orange County, Florida
Tampa Bay Buccaneers players